Zhang Ling (traditionally 34–156), courtesy name Fuhan, was a Chinese religious leader who lived during the Eastern Han Dynasty credited with founding the Way of the Celestial Masters sect of Taoism, which is also known as the Way of the Five Pecks of Rice and he was the founder of Taoism.

He is also known as Zhang Daoling, Celestial Master Zhang (Zhāng tiānshī), Ancestral Celestial Master (Zǔtiānshī) or Zhengyi Zhenren to Taoists. Zhang is sometimes pictured riding on a tiger. In some Taoist sects, Zhang, along with Ge Xuan, Xu Xun and Sa Shoujian, are called the "Four Celestial Masters".

Biography

The details of the life of the historical figure Zhang Ling are obscure; most of the information about him comes from later scripture and hagiography. According to these, Zhang traced his ancestral home to Feng County, Jiangsu, and was said to be a descendant of Zhang Liang. He was born in the tenth year of the Jianwu era during the reign of Emperor Guangwu of Han. He started reading the Tao Te Ching at a young age and studied in the Taixue (Imperial Academy) before. He served as a magistrate in Jiangzhou, Ba Commandery (present-day Chongqing) during the reign of Emperor Ming of Han.

Zhang later retired and led a reclusive life at Mount Beimang, where he practiced taoist methods of achieving longevity. When invited to serve as a boshi (equivalent of a present-day professor) in the Imperial Academy, he claimed that he was ill. Emperor He of Han summoned him thrice to serve as the Taifu (Imperial Tutor) but he refused again.

According to hagiographies compiled in approximately 400 C.E., in 142 C.E. the deity Taishang Laojun (a deified Laozi) revealed to Zhang on Mount Heming the "Doctrine of the Orthodox One [Resting On] the Authority of the Alliance", and bestowed upon him the title Celestial Master. The deity warned that plagues, beasts, and the demons of the Three Offices and Six Heavens of the underworld were due to be released upon humankind, and that only 240,000 people would be chosen as survivors and "seed people" to populate the new age, the era of Great Peace.

Zhang then endeavored to reform supposedly degenerate religious practices. After gathering numerous followers, he started a health cult that advocated certain longevity practices, recorded in books which have been lost. He founded a theocratic state in Sichuan organized into 24 parishes, later 28, which outsiders called the Way of Five Pecks of Rice, after a tax of that amount levied on followers. 

A major change instituted by the new Covenant was the rejection of food and animal sacrifices. The teachings of Laozi as transmitted by Zhang included the first true Taoist religious pantheon as distinguished from the prior ancient religion of China. The Xiang'er, a commentary on the Tao Te Ching preserved today in a sixth-century manuscript, is traditionally ascribed to Zhang Daoling's authorship and even if not his work may reflect his teachings.

Zhang is said to have died on Mount Qingcheng in 156 during the reign of Emperor Huan of Han at the purported age of 123. However, it is also said that Zhang did not die but learned the arcana of Taoism to ascend in broad daylight (Xiandao). Zhang reportedly disappeared on the day of his death, leaving nothing behind but his clothes.

Descendants

His descendants have held the title of Celestial Masters up to the present day, with the most recent claimants of the title currently residing in Mainland China and Taiwan.

See also
List of Celestial Masters
Way of the Five Pecks of Rice
Way of the Celestial Masters
Zhengyi Dao

Notes

156 deaths
Chinese hermits
Chinese religious leaders
Han dynasty Taoists
Longevity myths
Taoist immortals
Taoist religious leaders
Way of the Celestial Masters